Major-General Sidney Charles Manley Archibald MC (30 October 1890 – 1 January 1973) was a British Army officer who served in both World War I and World War II.

Military career
Born in 1890, Archibald, after attending and later graduating from the Royal Military College, Sandhurst, was commissioned into the Royal Artillery on 23 December 1910. He served in France throughout World War I, where he was awarded the Military Cross.

Like many others of his generation, he remained in the army during the interwar period and, after being married in 1925, attended the Staff College, Camberley from 1926−1927, where Harold Alexander, Douglas Wimberley, Charles Hudson and Brian Robertson were among his classmates. He then served on the staff of Northern Command, India, from 1929−1930, and later attended the Imperial Defence College in 1933. After that, from 1934, he served as a Staff officer in the War Office, until 1937, the same year he was promoted to colonel. The next year saw him being made an Assistant Quartermaster-Master General with Anti-Aircraft Command, later going on to command the 34th Anti-Aircraft Group the year after that.

Archibald was promoted to major-general in 1940, the year after the outbreak of World War II, where he served with Home Forces as General Officer Commanding (GOC) of the 11th Anti-Aircraft Division from 1941 to 1943. That year saw him as Advisor to Canada on Anti-Aircraft Defences until 1944 saw him retire from the army after well over thirty years of service.

Archibald, in his retirement, was Colonel Commandant of the Royal Artillery from 1952 to 1958. He died in Dorchester, Dorset on 1 January 1973, at the age of 82.

References

Bibliography

External links
Generals of World War II

1890 births
1973 deaths
British Army generals of World War II
British Army major generals
British Army personnel of World War I
Royal Artillery officers
Graduates of the Staff College, Camberley
Recipients of the Military Cross
Graduates of the Royal College of Defence Studies
Graduates of the Royal Military College, Sandhurst